Greisen is a highly altered granitic rock or pegmatite, usually composed predominantly of quartz and micas (mostly muscovite). Greisen is formed by self-generated alteration of a granite and is a class of moderate- to high-temperature magmatic-hydrothermal alteration related to the late-stage release of volatiles dissolved in a magma during the solidification of that magma.

Greisens are usually variably altered rocks, grading from coarse, crystalline granite, commonly vuggy with miarolitic cavities, through to quartz and muscovite rich rocks, which may be locally rich in topaz, tourmaline, cassiterite, fluorite, beryl, wolframite, siderite, molybdenite and other sulfide minerals, and other accessory minerals. They may occur as small to large veins, or large zones in the roof of some granites. The rocks can sometimes be mined as ores of tin and other minerals.

Petrogenesis
Greisens are formed by endogenous alteration of granite during the cooling stages of emplacement. Greisen fluids are formed by granites as the last highly gas- and water-rich phases of complete crystallisation of granite melts. This fluid is forced through the interstitial spaces of the granite into veins and pools at the upper margins, where boiling and rock alteration occur.

Alteration facies 
 
 Incipient greisen (granite): addition of muscovite ± chlorite, topaz, tourmaline, and fluorite (original texture of granites retained). 
 Greisenized granite: quartz-muscovite-topaz-fluorite, ± tourmaline (some original texture of granites retained). 
 Massive greisen: quartz-muscovite ± topaz ± fluorite ± tourmaline (typically no original texture preserved). Tourmaline can be ubiquitous as disseminations, concentrated or diffuse clots, or late fracture fillings. Greisen may form in any wallrock environment, but typically in granites and metamorphic rocks.

Greisen environments
Greisens appear to be restricted to intrusions which are emplaced high in the crust, generally at a depth between 0.5 and 5 km, as the hydrous fluid separation from granite to produce greisenation cannot occur deeper than about 5 kilometres. The roof or upper aureole is mostly sealed shut to prevent most fluids escaping. This sealing is largely due to hornfelsing and silicification of the overlying rocks, and fracturing of these rock typically forms greisen veins. 

They are generally associated mostly with potassic plutonic rocks; Alkali feldspar granite, and are rare in less potassium rocks like granodiorite or diorite. Greisens are prospective for mineralisation because the last fluids of granite crystallization tend to concentrate incompatible metals such as tin, tungsten, molybdenum and beryllium, and in places other metals such as tantalum, gold, silver, and copper.

Tectonically, greisen granites are generally associated with generation of S-type suites of granites in thick arc and back-arc fold belts where subducted sedimentary and felsic rock is melted.

Distribution

Examples of greisen are:
 Tin and tungsten deposits of Cornwall 
 Ardlethan, New South Wales, Australia (tin-antimony greisen)
 Timbarra gold mine, New South Wales, Australia (gold greisen deposit)
 Anchor Mine, Lottah, Tasmania, Australia (tin copper topaz greisen)
 Pitinga topaz granite, Brazil (tin, topaz, beryl)
 Lost River, Alaska, USA (tin greisen)
 Sisson Brook, Burnt Hill and other deposits, New Brunswick, Canada (tin-tungsten-molybdenum greisen)
 Erzgebirge, Czech Republic (tin greisen)
 Panasqueira Mine, Portugal Tin and Tungsten deposit 
 The Tin Range Tungsten-Tin deposit, Stewart Island/Rakiura, New Zealand

See also
 
 
 ; specifically for S-type and I-type distinction

References

Evans, A.M., 1993. Ore Geology and Industrial Minerals, An Introduction., Blackwell Science, 
Reed, B.L., 1986, Descriptive model of Sn greisen deposits, in Dennis P. Cox and Donald A. Singer, eds, Characteristics of mineral deposit occurrences: U.S. Geological Survey Bulletin 1693, http://pubs.usgs.gov/bul/b1693/html/bull217y.htm  
Taylor, R.G., 1979, Geology of tin deposits: Elsevier, Amsterdam, 543 p. 
Mustard, R. 2004. Textural, mineralogical and geochemical variation in the zoned Timbarra Tablelands pluton, New South Wales. Australian Journal of Earth Sciences, 51.
Richardson, G.C. (2016) Lottah and the Anchor: the history of a tin mine and a dependent town: North East Tasmania. Tasmania Forty South Publishing Pty Ltd, Hobart, 265 pages and maps.

External links
Lenharo, S.L.R., Pollard P.J., Born H., Matrix rock texture in the Pitinga Topaz Granite, Amazonas, Brazil, Brazilian Geoscience Reviews, vol 30, 2000 (pdf)

Igneous rocks
Economic geology